Wawota is a town of 543 people, located along Highway 48 in southeast Saskatchewan, Canada. Established in 1905, its name is from Dakota "wa ota", which means "much snow". Wa means 'snow', oda or ota means 'much'. It is sometimes mistakenly said to mean 'deep snow'.

History
The town's motto, "Progress Through Perseverance", is fitting, as Wawota has made a concerted effort in the last few decades to remain a vibrant community for people of all ages, despite the ongoing challenges faced by nearly all rural towns in the province. The loss of the local railway, the so-called Peanut Line, in August, 1961 is often cited as a galvanizing moment for the community, and the dawn of the town's progressive spirit.

Regionally, Wawota is perhaps best known for its long history of successful sports teams, most notably in hockey and baseball, as well as its unusual collection of fire hydrants, painted to resemble various people and cartoon characters. Wawota is also noteworthy as the 'twin capital', due to the large number of twin births recorded in the community, particularly throughout the 1970s and early 1980s.

Demographics 

Parks and recreation
Sports facilities include Lyle’s Ball Park for babeball, Wawota Forum for hockey, Wawota Curling Rink, and a soccer pitch. The Wawota Flyers senior men's hockey team of the Big 6 Hockey League plays at the Forum and the Wawota Pats senior men's baseball team of the Saskota Baseball League plays at Lyle's Ball Park.

Notable people
Former NHL player Brooks Laich

See also
List of communities in Saskatchewan
List of towns in Saskatchewan
List of place names in Canada of Indigenous origin
Rural Municipality of Wawken No. 93

References

External links

Wawken No. 93, Saskatchewan
Towns in Saskatchewan
Division No. 1, Saskatchewan